The term Sarpa may refer to any of the following:
 Sarpa salpa—a monotypic species of sea bream (fish)
 SARPA—a charter airline
 Sarpa—the Sanskrit term for snake/serpent, from which is derived:
 Sarpa (snakebite app)  (Snake Awareness, Rescue and Protection app)
 Sarpa Kavu, a Hindu sacred place in India
 Sarpa Samskara or Sarpa Dosha, a Hindu rite (pooja) practised in the Kukke Subramanya Temple
 Sarpa Satra, a legendary attempt to eliminate snakes
 Sarpa Satra, a poem by Arun Kolatkar
 Sarpa Lake, Russia

Monotypic marine fish genera